Vaginoplasty is any surgical procedure that results in the construction or reconstruction of the vagina. It is a type of genitoplasty. Pelvic organ prolapse is often treated with one or more surgeries to repair the vagina. Sometimes a vaginoplasty is needed following the treatment or removal of malignant growths or abscesses in order to restore a normal vaginal structure and function. Surgery to the vagina is done to correct congenital defects to the vagina, urethra  and rectum. It will correct protrusion of the urinary bladder into the vagina (cystocele) and protrusion of the rectum (rectocele) into the vagina. Often, a vaginoplasty is performed to repair the vagina and its attached structures due to trauma or injury. Labiaplasty, which alters the appearance of the vulva, can be performed as a discrete surgery, or as a subordinate procedure within a vaginoplasty.

Congenital disorders such as adrenal hyperplasia can affect the structure and function of the vagina and sometimes the vagina is absent; these can be reconstructed or formed, using a vaginoplasty. Other candidates for the surgery include babies born with a microphallus, people with Müllerian agenesis resulting in vaginal hypoplasia, trans women, and women who have had a vaginectomy after malignancy or trauma. Vaginoplasty can reduce the size of the entrance of the vagina or alter the appearance of the vulva.

Medical uses
Vaginoplasty is the description of the following surgical interventions:

 separation of congenitally fused urethra and vagina
 repair of a urethra that is short
 vaginal construction
 vaginal reconstruction
 vaginal vault prolapse
 vaginal suspension and fixation
 operations on cul-de-sac
 repair of cystoceleand rectocele
 retropubic paravaginal repair
 the repair of a cystocele using a graft or prosthesis
 the repair of a cystocele and a rectocele in the same procedure using a graft or prosthetic device
 the repair of a rectocele using a graft or prosthetic material
 the vaginal construction using a graft or prosthetic material
 the vaginal reconstruction using a graft or prosthetic material
 the vaginal suspension and stabilization using with graft or prosthetic material
 treatment of MRKH syndrome (vaginal agenesis)
 hymenorrhaphy

In some instances, extra tissue is needed to reconstruct or construct the vagina. These grafts used in vaginoplasty can be an allogenic, a heterograph, an autograft, xenograft, or an autologous material. A woman can use an autologous in vitro cultured tissue taken from her vaginal vestibule as transplanted tissue to form the lining of the reconstructed vagina. A reconstructed or newly constructed vagina is called a neovagina.

Vaginoplasties in children 

Conditions such as congenital adrenal hyperplasia virilize genetic females due to a 21-hydroxylase deficiency. Specific procedures include: clitoral reduction, labiaplasty, normalizing appearance, vagina creation, initiating vaginal dilation. Vaginal atresia, or congenital absence of the vagina, can be another reason for surgery to construct a normal and functional vagina. Vaginoplasty is used as part of the series of surgeries needed to treat those girls and women born with the bladder located outside of their abdomen. After the repairs, women have been able to give birth but are at risk of prolapse.

There are human rights concerns about vaginoplasties and other genital surgeries in children who are not old enough to consent, including concern with post-surgical sexual function, and assumptions of cisnormativity. There is no consensus attitude amongst clinicians about their necessity, timing, method or evaluation. Vaginoplasties may be performed in children or adolescents with intersex conditions or disorders of sex development.

Techniques
Non-surgical vagina creation was used in the past to treat the congenital absence of a vagina. The procedure involved the wearing of a saddle-like device and the use of increasing-diameter dilators. The procedure took several months and was sometimes painful. It was not effective in every instance. Uncommon growths, cysts, septums in the vagina can also require vaginoplasty.

Reconstructive surgery after cancer treatment
Radiological cancer treatment can result in the destruction or alteration of vaginal tissues. Vaginoplasty is often performed to reconstruct the vagina and other genital structures. In some cases, normal sexual function can be restored.

McIndoe surgical technique 
A canal is surgically constructed between the urinary bladder and urethra in the anterior portion of the pelvic region and the rectum. A skin graft is used from another area of the person's body. The graft is removed from the thigh, buttocks, or inguinal region. Other materials have been used to create the lining of the new vagina. These have been cutaneous skin flaps, amniotic membranes, and buccal mucosa.

Sex reassignment surgery 
Several techniques may be used in sex reassignment surgery to create a neovagina.

Penile inversion 
Inversion of the penile skin is the method most often selected to create a neovagina by surgeons performing sex reassignment surgery. The inverted penile skin uses inferior pedicle skin or abdominal skin for the lining of the neovagina. The skin is cut to form an appropriate-sized flap. The skin flap is sometimes combined with a scrotal or urethral flap.

The penile inversion technique was pioneered by Georges Burou in his Morocco clinic in the 1950s.  By the 1970s he had performed hundreds of them, and gave his first public presentation of his technique to a conference at Stanford University in 1973, after which it gradually became the predominant technique worldwide.

Bowel vaginoplasty
Bowel vaginoplasty is another commonly used method to create a neovagina in sex reassignment surgery.

Other methods 
Penile-scrotal skin flaps are also used. Nongenital full-thickness graft (FTG) or split-thickness skin grafts from other parts of the body have been used.

Elective vaginoplasty 
Critics have labeled such surgery as the "designer vagina". The American College of Obstetricians and Gynecologists issued a warning against these procedures in 2007 as did the Royal Australian and New Zealand College of Obstetricians and Gynaecologists, and a commentary in the British Medical Journal strongly criticized the "designer vagina" in 2009.  The Society of Obstetricians and Gynaecologists of Canada published a policy statement against elective vaginoplasty based upon the risks associated with unnecessary cosmetic surgery in 2013.

The World Health Organization describes any medically unnecessary surgery to the vaginal tissue and organs as female genital mutilation.

Vaginal rejuvenation is a form of elective plastic surgery. Its purpose is to restore or enhance the vagina's cosmetic appearance.

Hymen surgical procedures 

An imperforate hymen is the presence of tissue that completely covers the vaginal opening. It is cut to allow menstrual flow to exit during a short surgical procedure. A hymenorrhaphy is the surgical procedure that reconstructs the hymen.

Balloon vaginoplasty
In this procedure, a Foley catheter is laparoscopically inserted to the rectouterine pouch whereupon gradual traction and distension are applied to create a neovagina.

Pull through or Vecchietti procedure 
In treating Müllerian agenesis, the Vecchietti procedure is a laparoscopic surgical technique that produces a vagina of dimensions (depth and width) comparable to those of a normal vagina (ca. 8 cm deep). A small, plastic sphere called an olive is threaded (sutured) against the vaginal area; the threads are drawn though the vaginal skin, up through the abdomen, and through the navel. There, the threads are attached to a traction device, and then daily are drawn tight so that the olive is pulled inwards and stretches the vagina, by approximately 1 cm per day, thereby creating a vagina, approximately 7 cm deep by 7 cm wide, in 7 days. The mean operating room (OR) time for the Vecchietti vaginoplasty is approximately 45 minutes; yet, depending upon the patient and her indications, the procedure might require more time. The outcomes of Vecchietti technique via the laparoscopic approach are found to be comparable to the procedure using laparotomy. In vaginal hypoplasia, traction vaginoplasty such as the Vecchietti technique seems to have the highest success rates both anatomically (99%) and functionally (96%) among available treatments.

Other surgical techniques that have been developed include ileal neovagina (Monti's technique), the Creatsas vaginoplasty, the Wharton–Sheares–George neovaginoplasty, or the Davydov procedure. The most widely used is the Vecchietti laparoscopic procedure. Sometimes sexual intercourse can result in the dilation of a newly constructed vagina.

Vaginal dilators and expanders

The most techniques of vaginoplasty are using inflatable vaginal expanders or vaginal stents to design the vaginal diameter and length. At the end of the procedure the device stays in place to maintain the neovagina against the pelvic wall which also favors the process of microscopic neovascularization and reduces the risks of hematoma. In post-operative setting the expander can be used regularly to prevent post-operative vaginal retraction. Solid vaginal dilators can also be used immediately after surgery to keep the passage from attachments, and regularly thereafter to maintain the viability of the neovagina. The frequency required to use decreases over time, however remains obligatory lifelong.

Risks and complications
Reconstructive vaginoplasty in children and adolescents carries the risk of "superinfection".

In adults, rates and types of complications varied with sex reassignment vaginoplasty. Necrosis of the clitoral region was 1–3%. Necrosis of the surgically created vagina was 3.7–4.2%. Vaginal shrinkage occurred was documented in 2–10% of those treated. Stricture, or narrowing of the vaginal orifice was reported in 12–15% of the cases. Of those reporting stricture, 41% underwent a second operation to correct the condition. Necrosis of two scrotal flaps has been described. Posterior vaginal wall is a rare complication. Genital pain was reported in 4–9%. Rectovaginal fistula is also rare with only 1% documented. Vaginal prolapse was seen in 1–2% of people assigned male at birth undergoing this procedure.

The ability of emptying the bladder was affected for some patients after this procedure: 13% reported improvement, 68% said that there was no change and 19% reported that voiding got worse. Those reporting a negative outcome who experienced loss of bladder control and urinary incontinence were 19%. Urinary tract infections occurred in 32% of those treated.

History 

Reports of people seeking vaginoplasty go back to the 2nd century. The first modern gender-confirming surgery was performed in the 20th century, and in 1931 Dora Richter became the first known trans woman to successfully undergo vaginoplasty.

See also

 Intersex medical interventions
 Sex reassignment surgery (male-to-female)
 List of transgender-related topics
 Enterocele
 Sigmoidocele

References

Bibliography
 
 electronic book, no page numbers.

Gynecological surgery
Surgical oncology
Surgical removal procedures
Reproductive system
Gender-affirming surgery (male-to-female)
Female genital modification
Plastic surgery
Vagina
Pediatric gynecology
Chromosomes
Urethra disorders
Female genital mutilation
Intersex and medicine